Erythronium krylovii is a plant species known only from the Tuva and Krasnoyarsk regions in Siberia.

References

krylovii
Flora of Russia
Flora of Siberia
Plants described in 2011